In geometry, a truncated 5-cell is a uniform 4-polytope (4-dimensional uniform polytope) formed as the truncation of the regular 5-cell.

There are two degrees of truncations, including a bitruncation.

Truncated 5-cell

The truncated 5-cell, truncated pentachoron or truncated 4-simplex is bounded by 10 cells: 5 tetrahedra, and 5 truncated tetrahedra. Each vertex is surrounded by 3 truncated tetrahedra and one tetrahedron; the vertex figure is an elongated tetrahedron.

Construction

The truncated 5-cell may be constructed from the 5-cell by truncating its vertices at 1/3 of its edge length. This transforms the 5 tetrahedral cells into truncated tetrahedra, and introduces 5 new tetrahedral cells positioned near the original vertices.

Structure

The truncated tetrahedra are joined to each other at their hexagonal faces, and to the tetrahedra at their triangular faces.

Seen in a configuration matrix, all incidence counts between elements are shown. The diagonal f-vector numbers are derived through the Wythoff construction, dividing the full group order of a subgroup order by removing one mirror at a time.

Projections

The truncated tetrahedron-first Schlegel diagram projection of the truncated 5-cell into 3-dimensional space has the following structure:

 The projection envelope is a truncated tetrahedron.
 One of the truncated tetrahedral cells project onto the entire envelope.
 One of the tetrahedral cells project onto a tetrahedron lying at the center of the envelope.
 Four flattened tetrahedra are joined to the triangular faces of the envelope, and connected to the central tetrahedron via 4 radial edges. These are the images of the remaining 4 tetrahedral cells.
 Between the central tetrahedron and the 4 hexagonal faces of the envelope are 4 irregular truncated tetrahedral volumes, which are the images of the 4 remaining truncated tetrahedral cells.

This layout of cells in projection is analogous to the layout of faces in the face-first projection of the truncated tetrahedron into 2-dimensional space. The truncated 5-cell is the 4-dimensional analogue of the truncated tetrahedron.

Images

Alternate names 
 Truncated pentatope 
 Truncated 4-simplex
 Truncated pentachoron (Acronym: tip) (Jonathan Bowers)

Coordinates

The Cartesian coordinates for the vertices of an origin-centered truncated 5-cell having edge length 2 are:

More simply, the vertices of the truncated 5-cell can be constructed on a hyperplane in 5-space as permutations of (0,0,0,1,2) or of (0,1,2,2,2). These coordinates come from positive orthant facets of the truncated pentacross and bitruncated penteract respectively.

Related polytopes 
The convex hull of the truncated 5-cell and its dual (assuming that they are congruent) is a nonuniform polychoron composed of 60 cells: 10 tetrahedra, 20 octahedra (as triangular antiprisms), 30 tetrahedra (as tetragonal disphenoids), and 40 vertices. Its vertex figure is a hexakis triangular cupola.

Vertex figure Bitruncated 5-cell

The bitruncated 5-cell (also called a bitruncated pentachoron, decachoron and 10-cell) is a 4-dimensional polytope, or 4-polytope, composed of 10 cells in the shape of truncated tetrahedra.

Topologically, under its highest symmetry, [[3,3,3]], there is only one geometrical form, containing 10 uniform truncated tetrahedra. The hexagons are always regular because of the polychoron's inversion symmetry, of which the regular hexagon is the only such case among ditrigons (an isogonal hexagon with 3-fold symmetry).

E. L. Elte identified it in 1912 as a semiregular polytope.

Each hexagonal face of the truncated tetrahedra is joined in complementary orientation to the neighboring truncated tetrahedron. Each edge is shared by two hexagons and one triangle. Each vertex is surrounded by 4 truncated tetrahedral cells in a tetragonal disphenoid vertex figure.

The bitruncated 5-cell is the intersection of two pentachora in dual configuration.  As such, it is also the intersection of a penteract with the hyperplane that bisects the penteract's long diagonal orthogonally.  In this sense it is a 4-dimensional analog of the regular octahedron (intersection of regular tetrahedra in dual configuration / tesseract bisection on long diagonal) and the regular hexagon (equilateral triangles / cube).  The 5-dimensional analog is the birectified 5-simplex, and the -dimensional analog is the polytope whose Coxeter–Dynkin diagram is linear with rings on the middle one or two nodes.

The bitruncated 5-cell is one of the two non-regular convex uniform 4-polytopes which are cell-transitive. The other is the bitruncated 24-cell, which is composed of 48 truncated cubes.

 Symmetry 

This 4-polytope has a higher extended pentachoric symmetry (2×A4, [[3,3,3]]), doubled to order 240, because the element corresponding to any element of the underlying 5-cell can be exchanged with one of those corresponding to an element of its dual.

 Alternative names 
 Bitruncated 5-cell (Norman W. Johnson)
 10-cell as a cell-transitive 4-polytope
 Bitruncated pentachoron 
 Bitruncated pentatope
 Bitruncated 4-simplex 
 Decachoron (Acronym: deca) (Jonathan Bowers)

 Images 

 Coordinates 
The Cartesian coordinates of an origin-centered bitruncated 5-cell having edge length 2 are:

More simply, the vertices of the bitruncated 5-cell can be constructed on a hyperplane in 5-space as permutations of (0,0,1,2,2). These represent positive orthant facets of the bitruncated pentacross. Another 5-space construction, centered on the origin are all 20 permutations of (-1,-1,0,1,1).

 Related polytopes

The bitruncated 5-cell can be seen as the intersection of two regular 5-cells in dual positions.  =  ∩ .

 Related regular skew polyhedron 

The regular skew polyhedron, {6,4|3}, exists in 4-space with 4 hexagonal around each vertex, in a zig-zagging nonplanar vertex figure. These hexagonal faces can be seen on the bitruncated 5-cell, using all 60 edges and 30 vertices. The 20 triangular faces of the bitruncated 5-cell can be seen as removed. The dual regular skew polyhedron, {4,6|3}, is similarly related to the square faces of the runcinated 5-cell.

 Disphenoidal 30-cell 

The disphenoidal 30-cell is the dual of the bitruncated 5-cell. It is a 4-dimensional polytope (or polychoron) derived from the 5-cell. It is the convex hull of two 5-cells in opposite orientations.

Being the dual of a uniform polychoron, it is cell-transitive, consisting of 30 congruent tetragonal disphenoids. In addition, it is vertex-transitive under the group Aut(A4).

 Related polytopes 

These polytope are from a set of 9 uniform 4-polytope constructed from the [3,3,3] Coxeter group.

 References 
 H.S.M. Coxeter: 
 H.S.M. Coxeter, Regular Polytopes, 3rd Edition, Dover New York, 1973 
 Kaleidoscopes: Selected Writings of H.S.M. Coxeter', edited by F. Arthur Sherk, Peter McMullen, Anthony C. Thompson, Asia Ivic Weiss, Wiley-Interscience Publication, 1995,  
 (Paper 22) H.S.M. Coxeter, Regular and Semi Regular Polytopes I, [Math. Zeit. 46 (1940) 380-407, MR 2,10]
 (Paper 23) H.S.M. Coxeter, Regular and Semi-Regular Polytopes II, [Math. Zeit. 188 (1985) 559-591]
 (Paper 24) H.S.M. Coxeter, Regular and Semi-Regular Polytopes III, [Math. Zeit. 200 (1988) 3-45]
Coxeter, The Beauty of Geometry: Twelve Essays, Dover Publications, 1999,  p. 88 (Chapter 5: Regular Skew Polyhedra in three and four dimensions and their topological analogues, Proceedings of the London Mathematics Society, Ser. 2, Vol 43, 1937.) 
Coxeter, H. S. M. Regular Skew Polyhedra in Three and Four Dimensions. Proc. London Math. Soc. 43, 33-62, 1937.
 Norman Johnson Uniform Polytopes, Manuscript (1991)
 N.W. Johnson: The Theory of Uniform Polytopes and Honeycombs'', Ph.D. (1966)
 
  x3x3o3o - tip, o3x3x3o - deca

Specific

4-polytopes